Mountain breeze may refer to:
 Mountain breeze and valley breeze, a localized pair of winds.
 Mountain Breeze, a generic store-brand citrus soda.